The International Journal of Thermophysics is a bimonthly peer-reviewed scientific journal published by Springer Science+Business Media. It was established in 1980. The editor-in-chief is currently Marc J. Assael (Professor of Thermophysical Properties, Aristotle University of Thessaloniki, Greece). The 2020 impact factor was 1.608.

Scope
This journal covers research on theory and experimental results pertaining to the thermophysical properties of solid states, liquids, and gases, encompassing temperature, pressure, wavelength and other variables of interest. Instruments, techniques, measurement, computer modeling, and related systems are also covered.

Abstracting and indexing 
The journal is abstracted and indexed in:
 Chemistry Citation Index
 Current Contents/Physical, Chemical and Earth Sciences
 Materials Science Citation Index 
 Reaction Citation Index 
 Science Citation Index
 Academic OneFile 
 Astrophysics Data System 
 Chemical Engineering and Biotechnology Abstracts 
 Chemical Abstracts Service
 Chimica
 Earthquake Engineering Abstracts
 EBSCO databases
 EI/Compendex
 Engineered Materials Abstracts
 INIS Atomindex
 Inspec
 Scopus
 Summon by Serial Solutions

References

External links 
 

English-language journals
Physics journals
Publications established in 1980
Springer Science+Business Media academic journals
Bimonthly journals